Jörgen Augustsson (born 28 October 1952) is a Swedish former footballer who played as a defender.

Augustsson played for Åtvidabergs FF and Landskrona BoIS in Allsvenskan during his career. He was also capped 18 times for the Sweden national team and was a member of the squad in the 1974 FIFA World Cup.

He coached IFK Norrköping and Jönköpings Södra IF in 1996.

He was also the coach of Fyllingen from Bergen in Norway early in the 1990s.

References

External links

1952 births
Living people
Swedish footballers
Sweden international footballers
1974 FIFA World Cup players
Allsvenskan players
Åtvidabergs FF players
Landskrona BoIS players
Swedish football managers
IFK Norrköping managers
Jönköpings Södra IF managers
Åtvidabergs FF managers
Association football defenders